Jonas Björkman and Max Mirnyi defeated Mark Knowles and Daniel Nestor in the final, 6–2, 6–4 to win the doubles tennis title at the 2006 Tennis Masters Cup.

Michaël Llodra and Fabrice Santoro were the reigning champions, but did not qualify as a team as they did not compete together in 2006. Llodra failed to qualify overall, while Santoro qualified with Nenad Zimonjić, but was eliminated in the round-robin stage.

Seeds

Draw

Finals

Red group
Standings are determined by: 1. number of wins; 2. number of matches; 3. in two-players-ties, head-to-head records; 4. in three-players-ties, percentage of sets won, or of games won; 5. steering-committee decision.

Gold group
Standings are determined by: 1. number of wins; 2. number of matches; 3. in two-players-ties, head-to-head records; 4. in three-players-ties, percentage of sets won, or of games won; 5. steering-committee decision.

External links
Draw

Doubles